"Lose Control" is a song by Italian production trio Meduza, English singer Becky Hill and English production trio Goodboys, released as a single by Virgin Records on 11 October 2019. It reached number 11 on the UK Singles Chart. As of October 2022, the song has amassed more than 770 million streams on Spotify.

Background
"Lose Control" was largely written and produced in the winter of 2018 originally with vocals by Josh Grimmett from Goodboys and Conor Blake, a co-writer of the song. Later at the start of 2019 it got vocals and additional co-writing of verses and pre-chorus by Becky Hill and was finished in one day. The trio described it as a "radio friendly" track.

Composition
The second single by Italian production trio Meduza is a deep house track influenced by dance-pop. It is written in C Minor and has a chord progression Cm — Fm — A♭.

Music video
The music video was filmed in and around the abandoned residential development of Burj Al Babas, near the town of Mudurnu, Turkey.

Charts

Weekly charts

Year-end charts

Certifications

Release history

References

2019 singles
2019 songs
Meduza (producers) songs
Becky Hill songs
Goodboys songs
Virgin Records singles
Songs written by Becky Hill